Statistics of the Chinese Taipei National Football League in the 2001–02 season.

Overview
Taipower won the championship.

References
RSSSF

Chinese Taipei National Football League seasons
Chinese Taipei
1
1